The Hantan River is a river in South Korea, flowing through Gangwon and Gyeonggi Provinces. It is a tributary of the Imjin River, which eventually joins the Han River and empties into the Yellow Sea. The Hantan River is a popular site for white-water rafting.

History 
The infectious agent Hantaan orthohantavirus was first identified in the Hantan River area by Dr. Lee Ho-wang. Because his original publications transliterated the river's name idiosyncratically as "Hantaan," this spelling remains associated with the "Hantaan virus."  The name is also applied to the virus genus Orthohantavirus (formerly Hantavirus), as well as its family Hantaviridae.

In 2007 construction of the Hantangang Dam began on its lower course. It was expected to be complete in mid-2015. The sole purpose of the dam is flood control. It is also a battleground in the Korean War, but the riverside is beautiful, so the Hantang River National Tourist Resort is established.

See also 
 Rivers of Korea

References

External links 

 Comprehensive Water Quality Management Plan for the Imjin River Basin (includes map)

Rivers of North Korea
Rivers of South Korea
International rivers of Asia